Joseph Wightman was a British Army officer who is best noted for his role in the suppression of the 1715 and 1719 Jacobite rebellions. Wightman also participated in the Nine Years' War and the War of the Spanish Succession.

Early life

Wightman began his military career in 1690 when he was commissioned as Ensign in the First Foot Guards to Lt-Colonel Fraser Wheeler. 'Ensign' was the lowest officer rank, equivalent to a modern Second-Lieutenant; however, commissions held in the Foot Guards were senior to those other regiments i.e. a Guards Lieutenant would rank as a Captain elsewhere. This mattered in a world where rank and structure were extremely important in both civilian and military life; it also suggests Wightman came from an influential family.

Nine Years' War

The Foot Guards were in Flanders during the Nine Years' War and in July 1693 fought in the Battle of Landen. This was an Allied defeat with heavy casualties for those involved and on 7 August Wightman was promoted to Lieutenant with additional rank of Capt. 7 Aug. 1693 to Lt-Colonel Hobson Capt. with rank of Lt.-Col. 
8 Dec. 1696. Brevet-Col. 26 Aug. 1703. Appointed Col. of Col. Holcroft Blood's late Regt. of 
Foot (17 Foot) 20 Aug. 1707. Brigdr.-Genl. same year In May 1695 the regiment was in the operation in West Flanders and the covering army under the Prince of Vaudemont. On 11 August it then arrived to participate in the siege of the citadel of Namur. On 30 August it participated in a very bloody assault on Terra Nova in which Colonel Courthorpe was killed and Lieutenant-Colonel Matthew Bridges was severely wounded. Sir Matthew Bridges then became colonel of the regiment and the regiment wintered in Brugge. In 1696 the Bridges regiment was again under the Prince de Vaudemont, but nothing particular happened. In 1697 it was part of the main force and after the peace it retired to England and later Ireland.

Bridges regiment survived the demobilisation that followed the Treaty of Ryswick in 1697 by being placed on the Irish establishment and based in Ireland. On 15 June 1701 it embarked at Cork and sailed for Holland where it came in garrison at Gorkum. On 10 March 1702 the Bridges regiment marched to Roosendaal and later on to the Duchy of Cleves. In June it became mixed up in the Nijmegen affair. After that it participated in the siege of Venlo and in September it participated in the siege of Roermond. In 1703 the regiment was in the action of Loonaken and engaged in covering the sieges of Huy and Limbourg. Meanwhile, its Lieutenant-Colonel Holcroft Blood had succeeded as colonel on 26 August 1703. In October the regiment sailed from Holland to Portsmouth and on 15 March 1704 it landed in Portugal. Its Colonel Blood continued to serve as brigadier-general and

Jacobite risings

When the 1715 Jacobite rebellion broke out he commanded the first reinforcements sent to assist the Duke of Argyll at Stirling. He fought under Argyll at the Battle of Sherrifmuir in November 1715. The battle was inconclusive, but the Jacobite effort was severely hampered, and by the spring of 1716 the rebellion had been subdued. During the 1719 Rising he commanded the pro-Hanoverian forces that defeated the Jacobites at the Battle of Glen Shiel in June that year.

Notes

References

Bibliography
 Tony Jaques. Dictionary of Battles and Sieges: F-O. Greenwood Publishing, 2017.
 Jonathan Oates. The Last Battle on English Soil, Preston 1715. Routledge, 2016.
 Stuart Reid. Sheriffmuir 1715. Frontline Books, 2014.

People of the Jacobite rising of 1715
People of the Jacobite rising of 1719
1722 deaths
British Army generals
Grenadier Guards officers
British Army personnel of the War of the Spanish Succession
British military personnel of the Nine Years' War
Royal Leicestershire Regiment officers